Chir (also Romanized as Chīr; also known as Chīr Kord) is a village in Bastam Rural District, in the Central District of Chaypareh County, West Azerbaijan Province, Iran. At the 2006 census, its population was 125, in 21 families.

References 

Populated places in Chaypareh County